The FiFi Awards are an annual event sponsored by The Fragrance Foundation which honor the fragrance industry's creative achievements. Known as the "Oscars of the fragrance industry", the awards ceremony was conceived by the former president of The Fragrance Foundation, Annette Green. The  event has been held annually in New York City since 1973. The FiFi Awards are attended by around 1,000 members of the international fragrance community, designers and celebrities from the fashion, theater, film, and television industries.

Current Awards

Fragrance of the Year

Women's Fragrance of the Year - Popular

Women's Fragrance of the Year - Prestige

Women's Fragrance of the Year - Luxury

Men's Fragrance of the Year - Popular

Men's Fragrance of the Year - Prestige

Men's Fragrance of the Year - the Luxury range

Consumer Choice

Women's

Men's

Fragrance Hall of Fame

Bath & Body Line of the Year

Interior Scent Collection of the Year

Best New Celebrity Fragrance of the Year - Private Label/Direct Sell

Bottle Design

Women's Best Packaging of the Year - Prestige

Women's Best Packaging of the Year - Popular Appeal

Men's Best Packaging of the Year - Prestige

Men's Best Packaging of the Year - Popular Appeal

Advertising

Editorial Excellence in Fragrance Coverage - Women's Scent Feature

Editorial Excellence in Fragrance Coverage - Women's Scent Bite

Editorial Excellence in Fragrance Coverage - Men's Scent Feature

Best National Advertising Campaign - Print

Other Awards

Retailer of the Year

Technological Breakthrough of the Year

Discontinued Awards

Fragrance of the Year

Women's Fragrance of the Year - European

Women's Fragrance of the Year - Specialized

Women's Fragrance of the Year - Mass Appeal

Men's Fragrance of the Year - European

Men's Fragrance of the Year - Non-Store Venues

Advertising

Best National Advertising Campaign for a Women's Fragrance

Best National Print Campaign for a Women's Fragrance

Best National Advertising TV Campaign for a Women's Fragrance

Best National Advertising Campaign for a Men's Fragrance

Best National Print Campaign for a Men's Fragrance

Best National Advertising TV Campaign for a Men's Fragrance

Other Advertising Awards

Other Awards

Hall of Fame

Other Person Awards

Innovation of the Year

Miscellaneous Awards

References

External links
FiFi Awards Page
2006 FiFi Award Winners
2007 FiFi Award Winners
2008 FiFi Award Winners
2010 FiFi Award Winners
2011 FiFi Award Winners
2012 Fragrance Foundation Award Winners 
2013 FiFi Award Winners 
2014 Fragrance Foundation Award Winners

1973 establishments in New York City
Fragrance Foundation
Awards established in 1973
Recurring events established in 1973
Annual events in New York City